The World Show Jumping Championships, or the show jumping competition at the FEI World Equestrian Games, was started in 1953, with individual competition. In 1978 Team competitions began, and men and women began competing against one another. From 1990, show jumping was brought together along with the other equestrian disciplines into the World Equestrian Games (WEG). They are held every four years. The 2022 edition will be held in Herning, Denmark.

Past winners

Individual results

Team results

Women's results

Medal count

 Note 1: Medal count is sorted by total gold medals, then total silver medals, then total bronze medals, then alphabetically.
 Note 2: Germany includes both Germany and West Germany.

References

External links
World Championships Statistics by Canadian Show Jumping.

World Championships
Showjumping